Castel Ritaldi is a comune (municipality) in the Province of Perugia in the Italian region Umbria, located about 40 km southeast of Perugia.

Castel Ritaldi borders the following municipalities: Giano dell'Umbria, Montefalco, Spoleto, Trevi.

Twin towns
 Ijadabra, Lebanon

See also
Torre Grosso

References

External links
 Official website

Cities and towns in Umbria